Emre Can (born 12 January 1994) is a German professional footballer who plays as a central midfielder for Bundesliga club Borussia Dortmund and the Germany national team. A versatile player, Can can also play as a defensive midfielder, centre-back and full-back.

He began his senior career at Bayern Munich, playing mostly in the club's reserve side before his 2013 transfer to Bayer Leverkusen. A season later, he was signed by Premier League club Liverpool for £9.75 million where he made over 150 appearances across all tiers of competition and would join Juventus in 2018. In 2020 he was loaned to Borussia Dortmund; a few weeks later he moved on to an other team under a permanent deal.

He represented Germany from U15 to U21, and featured at the 2015 U21 European Championship. He made his senior debut in September 2015 and was selected for the 2016 European Championship. The following year, he was with Germany when they won the 2017 FIFA Confederations Cup in Russia, making his first senior international goal.

Club career

Early career
Born in 1994 in Frankfurt, Can joined local side SV Blau-Gelb Frankfurt at the age of six and remained at the club until 2006, when he joined the youth academy of Eintracht Frankfurt. During his time with both Frankfurt clubs, he predominantly played in midfield where he assumed an attacking role. In 2009, at the age of 15, he relocated to Bavaria after being signed by Bayern Munich.

Bayern Munich
During his first year in Bayern's academy, Can was used in the centre-back position before returning to midfield when he began playing for Bayern Munich II in the Regionalliga Bayern. He made his first team debut in the 2012 DFL-Supercup and his Bundesliga debut against 1. FC Nürnberg on 13 April 2013. His first and only league goal for the club came on 27 April 2013 in a 1–0 home win over SC Freiburg. Competing with Bastian Schweinsteiger, Luiz Gustavo and Javi Martínez for a spot in Bayern's midfield, he ultimately made only seven senior appearances before signing for fellow Bundesliga side Bayer Leverkusen in 2013 in search of regular game-time.

Bayer Leverkusen
On 2 August 2013, Can signed a four-year deal with Bayer 04 Leverkusen. A buy-back clause was included in the agreement which would have allowed Bayern to re-sign Can for a set-fee in 2015, an option they later declined to exercise.

Can made his debut for die Werkself on 31 August 2013, coming on as an 80th-minute substitute for Stefan Reinartz in a 2–0 defeat at FC Schalke 04. His first goal for the club came on 26 October when he scored the winner against FC Augsburg in a 2–1 victory. Can made his UEFA Champions League debut against Manchester United at Old Trafford later that month in a match which ended 4–2 in the favour of the English side.

In his only season at Leverkusen, Can scored four goals and made four assists in 39 appearances, while largely operating in a defensive capacity. His performances while at Leverkusen sparked interest from English club Liverpool, who noted Can's performances in both the Bundesliga and Champions League.

Liverpool
On 5 June 2014, Bayer Leverkusen confirmed that Can would join Liverpool after the Merseyside club activated his £9.75 million (€12 million) release clause. Liverpool manager Brendan Rodgers described Can in a press conference later in the week as an "inspirational young talent". The transfer was completed on 3 July 2014.

2014–15 season
Can made his competitive debut for the club on 25 August 2014, coming on as a substitute for Joe Allen in a 3–1 away defeat against Manchester City. The following month, he picked up an ankle injury while on duty with the German under-21 side and was sidelined for six weeks. On 19 October, following his return from injury, Can made his first start for Liverpool in a 3–2 win against Queens Park Rangers. He scored his first Liverpool goal on 8 November with a long-range shot past Thibaut Courtois, opening the scoring in an eventual 2–1 defeat to Chelsea. Against the same opponent in a League Cup semi-final defeat on 27 January 2015, Can was stamped on by Chelsea forward Diego Costa; referee Michael Oliver did not penalize the incident, but Costa was retrospectively banned for three matches by the FA. In April, Can received his first red card for Liverpool in 4–1 loss to Arsenal at the Emirates Stadium. Though naturally a midfielder, Can spent much of his debut season playing in defence, and ultimately featured 40 times for the campaign across all competitions.

2015–16 season
On 22 October 2015, in Liverpool's UEFA Europa League match against Rubin Kazan at Anfield, Can scored his first goal of the 2015–16 season. It was the club's first goal under the management of Can's compatriot and new manager Jürgen Klopp. On 14 February 2016, he scored his first league goal of the season in a 6–0 win over Aston Villa. While Can was often used at centre-back or full-back under Rodgers, with Klopp's arrival he was moved to his preferred position of central midfielder. He was praised by Klopp for his improvement and became a key cog in Liverpool's midfield. On 14 April 2016, Can ruptured his ankle ligaments in the Europa League quarter-final against Borussia Dortmund. Initially, he was ruled out for the rest of the domestic season. However, he returned ahead of schedule and played in the second leg of the semi-final against Villarreal. Can later revealed that he trained for 8 hours a day for 3 weeks to get fit for the Villarreal game.

2016–17 season
On 29 October 2016, Can scored his first goal of the season, scoring the opening goal in Liverpool's 4–2 win over Crystal Palace. On 6 November, Can scored Liverpool's third goal in their 6–1 win over Watford, which took Liverpool to 1st position in the Premier League for the first time under Jürgen Klopp. On 4 December, Can scored in Liverpool's 4–3 defeat to Bournemouth. On 12 March 2017, Can scored the winning goal in Liverpool's 2–1 win over Burnley, in what was called by Klopp an "ugly win". On 1 May 2017, Can scored an overhead kick in a 1–0 win over Watford, with the strike later earning him the BBC Goal of the Season and Carling Goal of the Season awards.

2017–18 season

On 23 August 2017, Can scored twice against Hoffenheim in the second leg of the Champions League play-off round in a 4–2 win for Liverpool on the night, and a 6–3 win on aggregate. These were his first goals for Liverpool in the new season. Can received praise for his performance during Liverpool's 4–0 win over Arsenal on 27 August. On 1 November, Can scored in Liverpool's 3–0 win over Slovenian side Maribor. His first league goal of the season came in a 5–1 away win over Brighton & Hove Albion, where he played at centre-back. On 30 January 2018, Can scored the opening goal in Liverpool's 3–0 win over Huddersfield Town at the Kirklees Stadium. On 24 February, he scored the opener in Liverpool's 4–1 win over West Ham United. On 17 March, during a game against Watford, Can suffered a muscle injury in his back, and it was reported that he could potentially miss the rest of the season out injured. Can returned in time for the 2018 UEFA Champions League Final against Real Madrid, but was only named on the bench. He came on as a substitute for James Milner in the 83rd minute. Liverpool lost the match by a scoreline of 3–1.

On 8 June 2018, it was confirmed by Liverpool via their official website that Can, along with Jon Flanagan and several youth players, would leave the club upon the expiry of their contracts, on 1 July 2018.

Juventus

2018–19 season
On 21 June 2018, Can signed a four-year deal with Serie A side Juventus following the expiration of his contract with Liverpool; the Italian club paid €16 million in additional costs for his services. Can became the tenth German player, after Hans Mayer Heuberger, Josef Edmund Heß, Helmut Haller, Thomas Häßler, Stefan Reuter, Jürgen Kohler, Andreas Möller, Sami Khedira, and Benedikt Höwedes, to join Juventus. A €50 million release clause was also included in Can's contract, only valid for clubs outside of Italy and starting from his third year of contract; this was the first time that Juventus had added a release clause to one of its player's contracts. He made his Serie A debut on 18 August, coming on as a substitute in a 3–2 away win against Chievo Verona. On 21 January 2019, Can scored his first goal for the club in a 3–0 home victory over the same opponents.

2019–20 season
At the beginning of the 2019–20 season, Juventus's new manager Maurizio Sarri left Can and Mario Mandžukić out of the club's Champions League squad for the group stage of the competition.

Borussia Dortmund
On 31 January 2020, Borussia Dortmund announced Can's signing on loan until the end of the 2019–20 season, with an obligation to buy. On 8 February, Can made his debut for Dortmund, also scoring a goal in a 4–3 away loss to Bayer Leverkusen. On 18 February 2020, the deal was made permanent on a four-year contract for €25 million, with the loan still expiring at the end of the 2019–20 season.

International career
Due to his Turkish ancestry, Can was eligible to play for the Turkey national football team, but he stated he "likes playing for Germany very much, and wants to make it in the DFB".

Youth
Can received call-ups for the German U15, U16 and U17 youth football teams. In 2011, he was a part of U17 team that finished as runners-up at the European Championships. He was also named in the team of the tournament. Later that year, he captained the squad in the 2011 FIFA U-17 World Cup and led his team to the semi-finals. During the semi-final, he netted a solo goal against Mexico: he received the ball with three markers closing in on him, skipped past one and paced forward before escaping two other opponents and evading the goalkeeper, but Germany were defeated 3–2.

He represented the under-21 team at the 2015 European Championship in the Czech Republic, starting all four matches. In their opening game at the Letná Stadium in Prague on 17 June, Can scored with a 17th-minute equaliser from the edge of the penalty area in a 1–1 draw against Serbia. In their second group match at the Eden Arena in Prague against Denmark on 20 June, Can hit a slide-rule pass to assist Kevin Volland's smart finish in the 32nd minute. In the 47th minute Can was awarded a free-kick, from which Volland doubled the lead thanks to a delightfully weighted free-kick from 25 metres out. Matthias Ginter rounded off the scoring to head in Amin Younes' cross just five minutes later leading to a 3–0 victory. Germany were eliminated in the semi-finals following a 5–0 defeat to Portugal on 27 June, in which Can started.

Senior

On 28 August 2015, Can received his first senior call-up from manager Joachim Löw, ahead of the following month's UEFA Euro 2016 qualifying matches against Poland and Scotland. He made his debut on 4 September in the first game, playing the full 90 minutes of a 3–1 win at the Commerzbank-Arena in Frankfurt.

On 31 May 2016, Can was named in Germany's final 23-man squad for UEFA Euro 2016. His sole appearance in the tournament came in the 2–0 semi-final loss to France, a match that Can started.

On 17 May 2017, Can was named in Germany's final 23-man squad for the 2017 FIFA Confederations Cup. Can made an appearance as a substitute in Germany's first game, a 3–2 win over Australia. He would appear in all 5 of his team's matches in the competition as Germany ran out winners in the final against Chile.

He scored his first senior international goal on 8 October, in a 5–1 home win in a 2018 World Cup qualifier against Azerbaijan.

In May 2018, he was left out of Germany's squad for the 2018 FIFA World Cup.

On 19 May 2021, he was selected to the squad for the UEFA Euro 2020.

Style of play
Can's ability to attack and defend from midfield has seen him compared to fellow German midfielders Michael Ballack and Bastian Schweinsteiger. Prior to calling Can up to the senior squad, German national team coach Joachim Löw reserved praise for the midfielder, stating that he has a good, all-round game and that they were following his progress.

Can has also been praised for his versatility which was showcased in his debut season at Liverpool where he showed his ability to play in several roles in both defence and midfield. Throughout his career, he has been deployed as a central midfielder, as a defensive midfielder, as an attacking midfielder, as a winger, in a box-to-box role, or even as a right-sided full-back, wing-back, or centre-back. He has also been singled out for his composure in possession, energy, positioning, and sense of timing, while former Liverpool midfielder and German international Dietmar Hamann described him as being "physically strong, a good passer and technically gifted". Pundit Jack Watson has labelled Can as a complete and versatile player, with excellent awareness, who is also "strong, quick, smart and can tackle, pass and shoot." Football writer Andrew Beasley has also noted that Can is strong in the air, while Matt Jones of Bleacher Report has described Can as an intelligent player, with good passing ability, who "...is powerful in possession and difficult to barge off the ball when he does march up the pitch." However, Jones has also described Can as being inconsistent at times.

Personal life
Can is a practising Muslim.

In October 2019, Turkish international footballer Cenk Tosun published a photograph on Instagram in which he stated support for soldiers involved in the Turkish offensive into north-eastern Syria. The post was initially liked by Can and İlkay Gündoğan, who are both German nationals of Turkish descent; however, they both later removed their likes. Regarding the incident, Can told the German newspaper daily Bild: "I am an absolute pacifist and against all forms of war," also stating that he unintentionally liked the post while scrolling through his timeline.

In January 2023, Can revealed that he had thyroid cancer which was diagnosed during his medical tests prior to joining Juventus, which required surgery in October 2018.

Career statistics

Club

1.Includes DFB-Pokal, FA Cup, and Coppa Italia.
2.Includes EFL Cup.
3.Includes UEFA Champions League and UEFA Europa League.
4.Includes DFL-Supercup and Supercoppa Italiana.

International

International goals
Scores and results list Germany's goal tally first.

Honours
Bayern Munich
 Bundesliga: 2012–13
 DFB-Pokal: 2012–13
 DFL-Supercup: 2012

Liverpool
 Football League Cup runner-up: 2015–16
 UEFA Champions League runner-up: 2017–18
 UEFA Europa League runner-up: 2015–16

Juventus
 Serie A: 2018–19
 Supercoppa Italiana: 2018

Borussia Dortmund
 DFB-Pokal: 2020–21

Germany U-17
 UEFA European Under-17 Championship runner-up: 2011
 FIFA U-17 World Cup: third place 2011

Germany
 FIFA Confederations Cup: 2017

Individual
 Fritz Walter Medal U17 Gold: 2011
 UEFA European Under-17 Championship Team of the Tournament: 2011
 Liverpool Young Player of the Season: 2015–16
 UEFA Europa League Squad of the Season: 2015–16
 Liverpool Goal of the Season: 2016–17
 BBC Goal of the Season: 2016–17
 Premier League Goal of the Season: 2016–17
 Bundesliga Goal of the Month: February 2020
 Bundesliga Goal of the Season: 2019–20

References

External links

 Profile at the Borussia Dortmund website
 
 
 
 
 
 
 Portrait at spox.com 
 kicker profile 

1994 births
Living people
German people of Turkish descent
Footballers from Frankfurt
German footballers
Association football midfielders
Association football utility players
FC Bayern Munich II players
FC Bayern Munich footballers
Bayer 04 Leverkusen players
Liverpool F.C. players
Juventus F.C. players
Borussia Dortmund players
Bundesliga players
Regionalliga players
Premier League players
Serie A players
Germany youth international footballers
Germany under-21 international footballers
Germany international footballers
UEFA Euro 2016 players
2017 FIFA Confederations Cup players
UEFA Euro 2020 players
FIFA Confederations Cup-winning players
German expatriate footballers
German expatriate sportspeople in England
German expatriate sportspeople in Italy
Expatriate footballers in England
Expatriate footballers in Italy